The 2012 World Men's Curling Championship was held from March 31 to April 8, 2012 at St. Jakobshalle in Basel, Switzerland. The 2012 World Men's Championship was one of the curling events that is a qualifier for the curling tournament at the 2014 Winter Olympics.

In the final, Canada's Glenn Howard defeated Scotland's Tom Brewster after making a draw to score the winning point, wrapping up the game with a score of 8–7. Canada won its third consecutive gold medal and thirty-fourth overall gold medal. Howard won his fourth gold medal and his second gold medal as skip, while Brewster won his second consecutive silver medal.

Qualification
 (defending champions)
 (host nation)
One team from the North American zone:
 (Brazil challenge withdrawn)
Seven teams from the 2011 European Curling Championships:

 (Winner of the World Challenge Games)
Two teams from the 2011 Pacific-Asia Curling Championships:

Teams
The teams are listed as follows:

*Kraupp, Edin's third, filled in as skip for Edin, who is experiencing back pain from sciatica. Edin was not scheduled to be out for the whole tournament, and was able to return to skip three games.
**Schwarz, the Swiss alternate, replaced Müller at the fourth position for six games. Müller played at lead, while Bamert sat out as the alternate.
***Løvold, the Norwegian alternate, replaced Svae at the second position for six games in the round robin, while Svae sat out as the alternate. Løvold also played as second in the playoffs.

Round-robin standings
Final round-robin standings

Round-robin results
All times are listed in Central European Summer Time (UTC+2).

Draw 1
Saturday, March 31, 2:00 pm

Draw 2
Saturday, March 31, 7:00 pm

Draw 3
Sunday, April 1, 9:00 am

Draw 4
Sunday, April 1, 2:00 pm

Draw 5
Sunday, April 1, 7:00 pm

Draw 6
Monday, April 2, 9:00 am

Draw 7
Monday, April 2, 2:00 pm

Draw 8
Monday, April 2, 7:00 pm

Draw 9
Tuesday, April 3, 9:00 am

Draw 10
Tuesday, April 3, 2:00 pm

Draw 11
Tuesday, April 3, 8:00 pm

Draw 12
Wednesday, April 4, 9:00 am

Draw 13
Wednesday, April 4, 2:00 pm

Draw 14
Wednesday, April 4, 7:00 pm

Draw 15
Thursday, April 5, 9:00 am

Draw 16
Thursday, April 5, 2:00 pm

Draw 17
Thursday, April 5, 7:00 pm

Tiebreaker
Friday, April 6, 2:00 pm

Playoffs

1 vs. 2
Saturday, April 7, 2:00 pm

3 vs. 4
Saturday, April 7, 9:00 am

Semifinal
Saturday, April 7, 8:00 pm

Bronze medal game
Sunday, April 8, 11:00 am

Gold medal game
Sunday, April 8, 4:00 pm

Player percentages
The top five player percentages of the round robin are as follows:

References
General

Specific

External links

2012 in curling
World Men's Curling Championship
International curling competitions hosted by Switzerland
International sports competitions hosted by Switzerland
Qualification events for the 2014 Winter Olympics
2012 in Swiss sport
Sports competitions in Basel
21st century in Basel
March 2012 sports events in Europe
April 2012 sports events in Europe